Alfred Schlageter (August 26, 1896 – September 21, 1981) was a Swiss actor.

Selected filmography
 The Divine Jetta (1937)
 After the Storm (1948)
 The Mountains Between Us (1956)
 The Crimson Circle (1960)
 William Tell (1960)
  The Strangler of the Tower (1966)
 Assassination in Davos (1975)

References

External links

1896 births
1981 deaths
Swiss male film actors